HXD may refer to:

 HxD, a computer program
 Delingha Airport, in Qinghai, China
 Douglas HXD, a flying boat
 Hilton Head Airport, in South Carolina, United States